The Children's Art Museum in Taipei is a museum in Shilin District, Taipei, Taiwan. The museum was established to promote art education for children, parents, teachers and the general public.

History
The museum was established in 2003.

Exhibitions
The museum has the following exhibition areas:

 Camel Exhibition
 Oasis Exhibition Area
 Art Tunnel Area
 Magic Room

Transportation
The museum is accessible within walking distance northeast from Shipai Station of the Taipei Metro.

See also
 List of museums in Taiwan

References

External links

 

2003 establishments in Taiwan
Art museums established in 2003
Art museums and galleries in Taiwan
Children's museums in Taiwan
Museums in Taipei
Child-related organizations in Taiwan